Willowby is a lightly populated locality in the Canterbury region of New Zealand's South Island.  It is situated in Mid-Canterbury, south of Ashburton, the major town of the area.  Other nearby settlements include Hinds and Lynnford to the southwest, Eiffelton to the south, and Huntingdon to the east.

Demographics
Willowby is part of the Eiffelton statistical area.

Economy 

The primary economic activity around Willowby is agriculture.

Education 

Until 2000, primary education was provided by Willowby School.  That year, three local schools merged to form Longbeach School, which is situated at the former site of Willowby School.  It caters for students in years 1-8 and has 120 pupils and five teachers.

Environment 

Willowby is located on the Canterbury Plains between the Ashburton River / Hakatere and Rangitata rivers.  The Pacific Ocean is a short distance away, with Eiffelton and Waterton between Willowby and the coastline.  At the turn of the 21st century, local efforts were improving the quality of Willowby's environment.  A barren shingle pit was converted into the Willowby Community Reserve, and other projects have been undertaken with the assistance of local government.

Religion 

Willowby formerly had its own Methodist church. It was founded in 1876 and closed in 1992.  Its stained glass windows are now at the Baring Square Methodist church in Ashburton, and a tapestry created by a member of Willowby Methodist Church to celebrate its centenary in 1976 was given to Tinwald's Methodist church.

Services 

Willowby has its own volunteer rural fire fighting unit.  It covers a catchment between the Ashburton and Hinds rivers and was founded to serve the local farming community, especially during dry summers.  It has 21 members, and as part of the national rural fire service, it can provide assistance and back-up to other volunteer units in the surrounding region.

Transport 

Willowby is situated off major transport routes.  State Highway 1 and the Main South Line railway pass nearby, through Winslow to the northwest.

References 

Ashburton District
Populated places in Canterbury, New Zealand